Krokocie  is a village in the administrative district of Gmina Ełk, within Ełk County, Warmian-Masurian Voivodeship, in northern Poland.

As of 2010, there was only one remaining ethnic German living there, nonagenarian Martha Piwak, who was born in the final days of the German Empire.

References

Krokocie